The Gran Premio Città di Camaiore was a road bicycle race held in Camaiore, Tuscany, Italy. Since 2005, the race has been organised as a 1.1 event on the UCI Europe Tour. It was an amateur race between 1949 and 1965. It was traditionally held in August, but in 2013 and 2014, was held in February. In 2014 it was announced that the race would be discontinued.

Professional winners

References

External links
 

UCI Europe Tour races
Cycle races in Italy
Classic cycle races
Recurring sporting events established in 1949
Recurring sporting events disestablished in 2014
Defunct cycling races in Italy
1949 establishments in Italy
2014 disestablishments in Italy